El Sharkia Hockey Team is the field hockey team of the El Sharkia Sporting Club, an Egyptian sports club. The team is notable for entering the Guinness Book of Records as winner of the African Championship Hockey League 26th edition, the 12th consecutive African title and the 25rd African win in history.

Sharkia Club won the title following a win against the Egyptian Police Club (former winner of the title), with 1 goal to 0 in Bulawayo, Zimbabwe, in the presence of between 5,000 and 20,000 fans.

Four Egyptian teams took part in the 26th edition of the African Cup of Club Champions hockey (men and women) in Zimbabwe: Sharkia team (men and women), Police Sports Association team (men), and Shams team (women).

Sharkia team played six games before the final round, in which the team won five, and tied in one. In the first game, the team won against Hamilton, Zimbabwe's champion, in the second against Malawi's champion, Genetrix, in the third against Hypo, Zimbabwe's champion, in the fourth the team had a tie with the Police team, in the fifth the team won against Police Machines, champion of Nigeria, and in the sixth against Trastis, Ghana's team.

Meanwhile, the women's team won the Kenya Women hockey title after winning against the host team in Zimbabwe by 7 goals to 0, maintaining the title, which it won last year in Ugandan capital Kampala.

Sharkia team followed its African dream in 1988 by winning the first African Clubs Championship which was hosted in Egypt in Police Sports Association Club. The team carried on with the African winnings in consecutive championships, year after year, with a total of 26 African championships, as well as 32 wins in the local league and 10 Egyptian cups and 5 super egypt cup  and Runners-up in Arab Hockey Club Championship 2013 the women team win 25 in the local league and 5 Egyptian cups and 4 super egypt cup and 1 African championships. The team made it to the Guinness Book of Records and became the first Arab team to be in the records and have a distinct place globally.

See also
El Sharkia SC

References

Zagazig
Field hockey clubs established in 1961
Egyptian field hockey clubs